The Ruston USO is a historic building located at 212 North Trenton Street in Ruston, Louisiana.

The Spanish Colonial Revival building served as the USO center from 1943 to 1945.  It served mostly Navy officers who were stationed at Louisiana Tech University who were in the V-12 program.  The USO was run by Mrs. Glasgow, and Mrs. Caroline Lewis also worked there, while Mr. Alex T. Hunt served as director.  There were several dances held there for soldiers, and there was even a wedding.  There was a ping-pong table, piano, and a lot of chairs and desks so that soldiers could write home.  There was one Sunday evening when there was a door count of 1400 soldiers!  The building was originally a movie theater that was converted into 2 storefronts.  For 50 years after the closing of the USO, this building housed several shoe stores.  In 1998, Kevin Hawkins of Hawkins Photography refurbished the building.

The building was listed on the National Register of Historic Places on February 11, 2011.

See also
 National Register of Historic Places listings in Lincoln Parish, Louisiana
 Downtown Ruston Historic District

References

Military facilities on the National Register of Historic Places in Louisiana
World War II on the National Register of Historic Places
Mission Revival architecture in Louisiana
Ruston, Louisiana micropolitan area
Organizations based in Louisiana
National Register of Historic Places in Lincoln Parish, Louisiana
1943 establishments in Louisiana
United Service Organizations buildings